Ma 6-T va crack-er (Standard French: Ma cité va craquer, English translation: My suburbs are Going to Crack, derived from craquer ("break down") and the drug crack cocaine) is a French movie directed by Jean-François Richet in 1997, caricaturing gang warfare. Richet explicitly made in an interview references to Marxism-Leninism as his ideology to produce this movie.

This influence is strong in one dialog where the teenagers say that a workers' strike is "more powerful against the system" than a ghetto riot. Also, the lyrics of 2Bal2Neg anthem "La Sédition" that we can hear at the end of movie speaks about "class struggle against the bourgeois class" and "a vanguard party founded to overthrow the society".

Setting 
The story is set in a cité (6-T in French slang), or housing project, in the Parisian suburb of Meaux. The residents are unhappy about their living conditions and are rebelling against this. Some critics compare it to the film La Haine, directed by Mathieu Kassovitz and starring Vincent Cassel, as well as to Le Cercle de la haine.

Cast
Arco Descat C.: Arco
Jean-Marie Robert: J.M.
Malik Zeggou: Malik
Mustapha Ziad: Mustapha
Hamouda Bouras: Hamouda
Jean-François Richet: Djeff 
Virginie Ledoyen: The girl with a gun
Brigitte Sy: The director
Emil Abossolo-Mbo: The gym teacher	
Mystik: Rap singer
Stomy Bugsy

Impact of the film 
French rap did well in the early 90s in France because of its rebellious lyrical content. It is used to illustrate the link between the reality and the atmosphere of this film, and to incite reflection in the viewer.

Artists such as IAM, X-Men, Assassin, KRS-One, 2 Bal, Mystik and more feature on the soundtrack, supporting Jean-François Richet's cinematography.

See also 
2005 civil unrest in France
Social situation in the French suburbs
List of hood films

References

External links
 
 

1997 films
French crime drama films
1990s French-language films
Hood films
Films directed by Jean-François Richet
1990s American films
1990s French films